Notter is a hamlet in the Dutch province of Overijssel. It is located in the municipality of Wierden, about 4 km southeast of the town of Nijverdal.

It was first mentioned in 1297 as Nuthere. The etymology is not clear. It has a statistical entity, and postal code, however it is still considered a hamlet of Wierden. In 1840, it was home to 367 people.

References

Populated places in Overijssel
Wierden